Karel Hájek (22 January 1900, in Lásenice – 31 March 1978, in Prague) was a Czechoslovak photographer who was represented by Schostal Photo Agency (Agentur Schostal). 

Among his best known photographs is the one of Klement Gottwald and Vladimir Clementis on a balcony in 1948 from which Clementis was later erased.

Gallery

References

Photographers from Prague
1900 births
1978 deaths
People from Jindřichův Hradec District
Czechoslovak photographers